Daniel Buda  (born 11 January 1970 in Romania) is a Romanian politician. He has been a member of the European Parliament since 2014. He is a member of the PDL (Democratic Liberal Party), which was merged into the PNL in 2014. In the 2019 election, he ran as a member of the PNL, again becoming an MEP. He is affiliated with the EPP group.

References 

1970 births
Living people
MEPs for Romania 2014–2019
MEPs for Romania 2019–2024